Sheldon Springs is an unincorporated community village in the town of Sheldon in Franklin County, Vermont, United States. A post office was established in 1871.

At one time it was known as Olmstead Falls.

References

Unincorporated communities in Vermont
Unincorporated communities in Franklin County, Vermont
Sheldon, Vermont